Placid is an unincorporated community in McCulloch County, Texas.

History
A post office called Placid was established in 1908, and remained in operation until 1965. The community was so named on account of the tranquility of the original site.

References

Unincorporated communities in McCulloch County, Texas
Unincorporated communities in Texas